Howard Vernon (Mario Walter Lippert) (15 July 1908 – 25 July 1996) was a Swiss actor. In 1961, he became a favorite actor of Spanish film director Jesús Franco and began starring in many low-budget horror and erotic films produced in Spain and France. After portraying Franco's mad doctor character Dr. Orloff,  he eventually appeared in a total of 40 Franco films, in addition to his roles for numerous other directors.

Life and career
Vernon was born Mario Lippert in Baden-Baden, Germany, to a Swiss father and an American mother, and was fluent in German, English and French. Originally a stage and radio actor, he worked primarily in France and became a well-known supporting actor after 1945 by playing villainous Nazi officers in post-war French films. Jean-Pierre Melville's Le Silence de la mer, in which he played a gentle anti-Nazi German officer, made him somewhat famous but, in part due to his rough-hewn looks and Swiss accent, he was subsequently relegated to playing gangsters and heavies. 
 
In the 1960s, he became a favorite actor of Spanish horror director Jesús Franco and began starring in many low-budget horror and erotic movies produced in Spain and France, often portraying a mad doctor or a sadist. He continued to make increasingly small appearances in high-profile films while often getting top billing in many Grade-Z low budget films. Horror film fans consider his three greatest horror roles to be The Awful Dr. Orloff (1961) which introduced Franco's famed mad doctor character, Dracula vs Frankenstein (1971) in which he actually played Count Dracula, and The Erotic Rites of Frankenstein (1972) in which he played the insanely evil Count Cagliostro. Franco considered
Revenge in the House of Usher (1982) to be one of Vernon's greatest roles.

Death
He remained active until his death from natural causes in 1996. He died in Issy-les-Moulineaux, France, 10 days after his 88th birthday.

Selected filmography

Boule de Suif (1945) .... Un Prussien (uncredited)
Jericho (1946) .... Un officier allemand (uncredited)
A Friend Will Come Tonight (1946) .... Robert Langlois, le muet
Les clandestins (1946)
L'insaisissable Frédéric (1946) .... (uncredited)
Night Warning (1946) .... L'aviateur anglais
Mr. Orchid (1946) .... Le lieutenant Fleischer, l'officier allemand
Devil and the Angel (1946) .... Un Homme de Main de Furet
The Royalists (1947) .... Le capitaine Gérard
Le Bataillon du ciel (1947) .... Un officier allemand (uncredited)
The Die Is Cast (aka "The Chips Are Down") (1947) .... Le chef milicien
Le colonel Durand (1948)
The Lame Devil (1948, director: Sacha Guitry) .... Lord Palmerston
Le Silence de la mer (1949, director: Jean-Pierre Melville) .... Werner von Ebrennac
Du Guesclin (1949) .... Lancaster
The Man on the Eiffel Tower (1949) .... Inspector (uncredited)
L'auberge du péché (1949) .... Ducourt
Fusillé à l'aube (1950) .... Colonel von Pennwitz
The Fighting Pimpernel (1950) .... Comte de Tournai
Black Jack (1950) .... Schooner Captain
Adventures of Captain Fabian (1951) .... Emile
Boîte de nuit (1951) .... Charles
Si ça vous chante (1951)
The Secret of the Mountain Lake (1952) .... Borgo, der Schmugglerwirt
The Girl with the Whip (1952) .... Borgo
Manina, the Girl in the Bikini (1952) .... Éric
La môme vert-de-gris / Poison Ivy  (1953) .... Rudy Saltierra
Monsieur Scrupule, Gangster (1953) .... L'ami de Rolande
Little Jacques (1953) .... Daniel Mortal
Lucrèce Borgia (1953) .... Le chapelain
Royal Affairs in Versailles (1954) .... L'acheteur anglais (uncredited)
Opération Tonnerre (1954) .... Roger Kervec
The Phantom of the Big Tent (1954) .... Armand LaRue, König der Luft
Napoléon (1955) .... Lord Liverpool (uncredited)
Pas de souris dans le business (1955) .... Robert Leperque
El fugitivo de Amberes (1955, director: Miguel Iglesias) .... Bell Fermer
 (1955) .... CIC-Offizier Ted
Alerte aux Canaries (1956) .... Maxime Bellac
Bob le Flambeur (1956) .... McKimmie - le commanditaire
La melodía misteriosa (1956) .... L'inspecteur de police Revel
 The River of Three Junks (1957) .... Igor Kourguine
Jusqu'au dernier (1957) .... Philippe Dario - le trapéziste
Doctor Crippen Lives (1958)
Pensione Edelweiss (1959) .... Général Funck
Heiße Ware (1959) .... Heinrich Strasser
 Nathalie, Secret Agent (1959).... William Dantoren
Muerte al amanecer (1959)
Une gueule comme la mienne (1960) .... Howard
The Thousand Eyes of Dr. Mabuse (1960, director: Fritz Lang) .... No. 12
Brandenburg Division (1960) .... Secret Service Man
Interpol Against X (1960) .... L'inspecteur Jackson
The Secret Ways (1961) .... Colonel Hidas
Léon Morin, Priest (1961) .... The colonel
Capitaine tempête (1961)
First Criminal Brigade (1962) .... Steven Hals
The Awful Dr. Orloff / Screams in the Night/ Gritos en la Noche/ L'Horrible Docteur Orloff (1962, director: Jesús Franco) .... Dr. Orloff
Zorro the Avenger (1962) .... General Clarence
Han matado a un cadáver (1962) .... Inspector Bernhardt
Shades of Zorro (1962) .... El General
La mano de un hombre muerto/ The Sadistic Baron Von Klaus (1962) .... Baron Max von Klaus
Vice and Virtue (1963) .... SS General
Autopsy of a Criminal (1963) .... Villar
Black Angel of the Mississippi (1964) .... Ray Terris
The Train (1964, director: John Frankenheimer) .... Dietrich
On Murder Considered as One of the Fine Arts (1964)
Alphaville (aka "Une étrange aventure de Lemmy Caution") (1965, director: Jean-Luc Godard) .... Prof. Leonard Nosferatu aka von Braun (uncredited)
What's New Pussycat? (1965, director: Clive Donner) .... Doctor
Taiwo Shango - Der zweite Tag nach dem Tod (1965) ... Dr. Brian Murray
Train d'enfer (1965, director: Gilles Grangier) .... Le 'professeur'
The Poppy Is Also a Flower (1966) .... Dr. Pineau
The Game Is Over (1966) .... Lawyer
The Diabolical Dr. Z / Miss Muerte / Miss Death (1966, director: Jesús Franco) .... Dr. Vicas
Le chien fou (1966) .... Fred
Triple Cross (1966) .... German Embassy Official
Residencia para espías/ Residence for Spies (1966) .... Radek (uncredited cameo)
The Unknown Man of Shandigor (1967) .... Yank / Bobby Gun
The Night of the Generals (1967) .... Herr Schusslig, Suspect in Erika Müller's Murder (uncredited)
Only a Coffin (1967) .... Dam Gaillimh
Les têtes brûlées (1967)
Necronomicon: Dreamt Sin / Succubus (1967, director: Jesús Franco) .... Admiral Kapp
Im Schloß der blutigen Begierde (1968) .... Graf Saxon
Mayerling (1968) .... Prince Montenuevo (uncredited)
Marquis de Sade's Justine / Deadly Sanctuary  (1969, director: Jesús Franco) .... Clément
The Bloody Judge / Throne of Fire/ The Witch Killer of Blackmoor (1970, director: Jesús Franco) .... Jack Ketch
The Blood Rose / Le Rose Eschorchée / The Flayed Rose  (1970, director: Claude Mulot) .... Professeur Römer
Orloff and the Invisible Man (1970, director: Pierre Chevalier) .... Le professeur Orloff
Love Me Strangely (1971) .... Maître Wasserman - l'administrateur de biens
The Devil Came from Akasava (1971, director: Jesús Franco) .... Valet Humphrey
 / X 312 – Flug zur Hölle (1971, director: Jesus Franco) .... Pedro
She Killed in Ecstasy / Mrs. Hyde (1971, director: Jesús Franco) .... Prof. Jonathan Walker
Jungfrauen-Report/ Virgin Report (1972) .... Medieval de-fliowerer / Anna's Father / The Inquisitor
Sex Charade (1972) unreleased
Casa d'appuntamento (1972) .... Professor Waldemar
Dracula, Prisoner of Frankenstein (1972, director: Jesús Franco) .... Drácula
Robinson und seine wilden Sklavinnen/ Three Naked Women on Robinson Island (1972) .... Yakube / Actor in Adult Movie / Film Director's Assistant
Daughter of Dracula (1972, director: Jesús Franco) .... Count Karlstein / Dracula
Les ebranlées/ House of Vice (1972) .... Al Pereira
The Demons (1973, director: Jesús Franco) .... Lord Malcolm De Winter
The Day of the Jackal (1973) .... Cabinet Member (uncredited)
The Erotic Rites of Frankenstein / The Curse of Frankenstein / La Maldicion de Frankenstein (1973, director: Jesús Franco) .... Cagliostro
Le journal intime d'une nymphomane (1973) .... Doctor
Lovers of Devil's Island (1973, director: Jesús Franco) .... Colonel Ford
A Virgin Among the Living Dead (1973) /  Christina, Princess of Eroticism (1971, director: Jesús Franco) .... Uncle Howard
Al otro lado del espejo / The Other Side of the Mirror (1973) .... Howard / Anetta's father
Un capitán de quince años / A Captain of 15 Years (1974) .... Korda
Plaisir à trois/ How to Seduce a Virgin (1974) .... Mathias
Celestine, Maid at Your Service (1974) .... Le duc
Lorna the Exorcist (1974, director: Jesús Franco) .... Maurizius
La Comtesse Perverse (1974, director: Jesús Franco) .... Count Rador
Les gloutonnes (1975) .... Cagliostro
That Most Important Thing: Love (1975) .... (voice, uncredited)
Les intrigues de Sylvia Couski (1975)
Le jardin qui bascule (1975) .... Paul
Love and Death (1975, director: Woody Allen) .... General Leveque
Change pas de main (1975) .... Jacques des Grieux
The Mark of Zorro (1975) .... Gov. Hayes
The Musician Killer (1976) .... Anton Varga
Seven Women for Satan (1976) .... Karl, Zaroff's servant
Le théâtre des matières (1977) .... Hermann
Women in Cellblock 9 (1978) .... Dr. Milton
Les belles manières (1978) .... Le directeur de la prison
From Hell to Victory (1979) .... SS Major Karl
Zombie Lake / Le Lac des Morts Vivants / Lake of the Living Dead  (1981, director: Jean Rollin) .... The Mayor
Docteur Jekyll et les femmes (1981) .... Dr. Lanyon
L'appât du gain (1981)
Revenge in the House of Usher / Neurosis (1982, director: Jesús Franco) .... René Dimanche
Revenge in the House of Usher (1983) .... Eric Usher
Sangre en mis zapatos/ Blood on my Shoes (1983) .... Profesor Albert Von Klaus
Ogroff (1983) .... Vampire
Le fou du roi (1984) .... Abbé guibourd
The Sinister Dr. Orloff (1984, director: Jesús Franco) .... Dr. Orloff
All Mixed Up (1985) .... Le docteur Belin - un médecin hémiplégique
The Boy Who Had Everything (1985) .... Singing Man
Viaje a Bangkok, ataúd incluido (1985) .... Coronel Daniel J. Blimp
El hombre que mató a Mengele (1985)
Faubourg St Martin (1986) .... Le Clients Grincheux
Las tribulaciones de un Buda Bizco (1986)
Terminus (1987) .... Monsieur (voice)
The Death of Empedocles (1987) .... Hermokrates
Commando Mengele (1987) .... Josef Mengele
Dernier été à Tanger (1987) .... Maître Schmidt, un avocat suisse
Faceless / Predators of the Night (1987, director: Jesús Franco) .... Docteur Orloff
Howl of the Devil (1987, director: Paul Naschy) .... Eric
Black Sin (1989, Short) .... Manes
Le champignon des Carpathes (1990) .... Jeremy Fairfax
In the Eye of the Snake (1990) .... Old Jean
Delicatessen (1991, director: Jean-Pierre Jeunet) .... Frog Man
The Girl Who Came Late (1992) .... Dr. Montgomery
Faux rapports (1992) .... Garnier
Hey Stranger (1994) .... Old officer
Le Rocher d'Acapulco (1995) .... Le vieil homme
Le complexe de Toulon (1996) .... Charles Toulon
Banqueroute (2000) .... Georges (final film role)

References

External links
 
 Howard Vernon biography (in French)

1908 births
1996 deaths
Swiss male film actors
Swiss male stage actors
Swiss male television actors
Male actors from Paris
20th-century Swiss male actors